Family Jewels or The Family Jewels may refer to:

Family Jewels (Central Intelligence Agency), a set of reports on the CIA's illegal activities
Family Jewels (video compilation), a two-disc compilation DVD by the hard rock band AC/DC, featuring the group's music videos, live clips and promotional videos from 1975 to 1991
The Family Jewels (Marina and the Diamonds album), 2010
"The Family Jewels", a bonus track from the album
The Family Jewels (band), a 1990s rock band, and their self-titled album
The Family Jewels (film), 1965 film starring Jerry Lewis
Gene Simmons Family Jewels, an American reality TV series
Bijuterii de familie, translated to English as Family Jewels, a novel by Petru Dumitriu
A male's testicles (as a slang term)

See also
Family Joules, a 2003 album by Foghat
Jewellery, a form of personal adornment, such as brooches, rings, necklaces, earrings, and bracelets
Heirloom, something, perhaps an antique or some kind of jewelry, that has been passed down for generations through family members